The 2019 Maryland Terrapins football team represented the University of Maryland, College Park in the 2019 NCAA Division I FBS football season. The Terrapins played their home games at Maryland Stadium in College Park, Maryland and competed in the East Division of the Big Ten Conference. They finished the season 3–9, 1–8 in Big Ten play to finish in sixth place in the East Division.

Offseason

Previous season
The Terrapins finished with a record of 5–7, making it another losing season in the Big Ten Conference. As a result of the death of player Jordan McNair after a preseason workout, head coach D. J. Durkin was fired in November. Mike Locksley was named to replace Durkin as head coach instead of interim coach Matt Canada.

Spring game
Maryland held its annual Red-White spring exhibition game on April 27, 2019. The Red team, led by redshirt junior quarterback and game MVP Tyler DeSue, triumphed over the White team 28–17.

Recruiting

Transfers

Preseason Big Ten poll
Although the Big Ten Conference has not held an official preseason poll since 2010, Cleveland.com has polled sports journalists representing all member schools as a de facto preseason media poll since 2011. For the 2019 poll, Maryland was projected to finish in sixth in the East Division.

Award watch lists

Personnel

Roster

Depth chart

Schedule

Game summaries

Howard

Syracuse

at Temple

Penn State

at Rutgers

at Purdue

Indiana

at Minnesota

Michigan

Sources:

at Ohio State

Nebraska

at Michigan State

2020 NFL Draft

Rankings

References

Maryland
Maryland Terrapins football seasons
Maryland Terrapins football